Jennifer Mary Elfman (née Butala, born 1971) is an American actress. She is best known for her leading role as Dharma on the ABC sitcom Dharma & Greg (1997–2002), for which she received the Golden Globe Award for Best Actress – Television Series Musical or Comedy in 1999, and three nominations for the Primetime Emmy Award for Outstanding Lead Actress in a Comedy Series. After making her film debut in Grosse Pointe Blank (1997), she has appeared in Krippendorf's Tribe (1998), Dr. Dolittle (1998), EDtv (1999), Keeping the Faith (2000), Town & Country (2001), Looney Tunes: Back in Action (2003), Clifford's Really Big Movie (2004), and Big Stone Gap (2014).

Elfman has also played leading roles on other television comedies, including Courting Alex (2006), Accidentally on Purpose (2009–2010), 1600 Penn (2012–2013), Growing Up Fisher (2014), and Imaginary Mary (2017). She also had a recurring role on the FX legal drama Damages in 2012, and has been a series regular on the AMC horror drama series Fear the Walking Dead since 2018.

Early life
Elfman was born Jennifer Mary Butala in Los Angeles, California. She was the youngest of three children born to homemaker Sue Butala (née Grace) and Richard Butala, a Hughes Aircraft executive. Her paternal uncle is Tony Butala, lead singer of the American vocal trio The Lettermen since 1958. She is of Croatian ancestry on her father's side and was raised Roman Catholic.

Elfman attended high school at St. Genevieve High School in the San Fernando Valley for a year, before eventually graduating at the Los Angeles County High School for the Arts; she then attended college at California State University, Northridge (CSUN). She trained in ballet from age five, but later gave it up when a tendon separated from bone. She studied at the Westside School of Ballet, receiving a full scholarship.

Career

Elfman began her professional career as a dancer, appearing in music videos for Depeche Mode ("Halo", 1990), Anthrax ("Black Lodge", 1993), and Chris Isaak ("Somebody's Crying", 1995), and touring with the rock band ZZ Top on their 1994 tour as a "Legs Girl". After appearing in television commercials, Elfman was cast in the short-lived 1996 American sitcom Townies on ABC. In 1997, Elfman was cast in Dharma & Greg on ABC as Dharma Freedom Finkelstein Montgomery. The show ran for five seasons until its cancellation in 2002.

In 2012, Elfman and her husband Bodhi started their podcast, Kicking and Screaming by Jenna and Bodhi Elfman.

In 2013, Elfman appeared in two NBC comedy series, 1600 Penn and Growing Up Fisher, which were each cancelled after a single season.

In 2016, Elfman was cast in the ABC comedy series Imaginary Mary. Like 1600 Penn and Growing Up Fisher, the series was cancelled after its first season.

Personal life
In February 1991, she met actor Bodhi Pine Elfman (né Saboff) during an audition for a Sprite commercial. Four years later, they were married on February 18, 1995. Bodhi is of Jewish descent, and Jenna was raised Catholic. When they met, he was a practicing Scientologist. Jenna became a Scientologist after her husband introduced her to its teachings.

Scientology
Elfman is a member of the Church of Scientology.

In 2005, she appeared at the Scientology-backed Citizens Commission on Human Rights' "Psychiatry: An Industry of Death" museum grand opening, and she and husband Bodhi are listed on the organization's website as members of the board of advisers from the arts, entertainment, and media community.

On May 24, 2006, she was the keynote speaker at the Human Rights Hero Award event in participation with the Scientology-affiliated groups Youth for Human Rights International and Artists for Human Rights (AFHR), an organization formed with the purpose of bringing artists together with the common cause of raising awareness of human rights around the world.

On March 27, 2008, she and actor Charlie Sheen co-hosted the Scientology-affiliated New York Rescue Workers Detoxification Project Charity Event at Geisha House in Hollywood.

Fundraising activities
Elfman participated in fundraising activities, including donating an hour of her time for auction, donating a print of her lips, participating in a telethon fundraiser, hosting a comedy show, and asking for charity donations instead of birthday presents.

Elfman participated in awareness-raising initiatives, including modeling for a fashion show, reading to schoolchildren as part of the National Education Association Read Across America program, and hosting a party in her home to raise awareness for causes headed by the Environmental Working Group.

Elfman is on the board of directors of the Dizzy Feet Foundation.

Filmography

Film

Television

Music videos

Accolades

References

External links

 
 

1971 births
Living people
20th-century American actresses
21st-century American actresses
Actresses from Los Angeles
American film actresses
American film producers
American people of Croatian descent
American people of Danish descent
American television actresses
Television producers from California
American women television producers
Best Musical or Comedy Actress Golden Globe (television) winners
California State University, Northridge alumni
Jenna
American Scientologists
American women podcasters
American podcasters
Converts to Scientology from Roman Catholicism
Los Angeles County High School for the Arts alumni
American women film producers